VitBe was a brand of brown bread made in Britain by Allied Mills. It has been suggested that its name derives from bread's Vitamin B content, since bread contains thiamine (B1), and/or from the association with the word vitality.

See also
 List of brand name breads

References

Brand name breads